Émilie Delorme (born ), an engineer by training, has a career in the management of cultural institutions in France. On 14 December 2019 Delorme was appointed as the first woman director of the Conservatoire de Paris in its 224-year history, to start in the position on 1 January 2020.

Childhood and education
Delorme was born in Lyon. She studied at one of the Mines engineering schools, worked in finance for three years, and studied cultural institution management.

Aix-en-Provence Festival
Delorme participated in the Aix-en-Provence Festival in 2000 and the Théâtre Royal de la Monnaie in Brussels in 2003, returning to the Aix-en-Provence Festival in 2008. She became the director of the Aix-en-Provence Festival in 2009.

During this period, Delorme developed artistic cooperation projects around the Mediterranean Basin, creating the MEDiterranean INcubator of Emerging Artists (Medinea) network and heading the European Network of Opera Academies (ENOA).

Conservatoire de Paris
On 14 December 2019, Delorme was appointed as the first woman director of the Conservatoire de Paris since its creation in 1795 and the first non-musician director after the founder in 1795.  Le Point expressed concerns that Delorme would promote "decolonial ideology" and intersectional feminism. Le Monde described Delorme as strongly promoting gender equality and cultural diversity, and stated that the initial rumours of Delorme's nomination led to defensive reactions from media including Le Point. Delorme's appointment is for three years starting from 1 January 2020.

References

Living people
People from Lyon
1975 births
Arts administrators
Women academic administrators
Women arts administrators
Directors of the Conservatoire de Paris